Conspiracy 365 is a 12-part Australian television miniseries based on the novels written by Gabrielle Lord. Produced by Circa Media for Family Movie Channel, the series screened from January 2012. It also began screening on ABC3 in January 2014.

The series is based on a series of books written by Gabrielle Lord. It follows the adventures of Callum Ormond, an Australian 15-year-old who is forced to become a fugitive as he searches for the truth behind the death of a family member. The book series is in 17 installments, telling the story from January to December, and then Boges's story (Revenge) following the twelfth installment and Winter's story (Malice) following Callum's and then Callum's story again in a 3 book mini-series (Black Ops).

The television series screens in 12 forty minute to one-hour episodes throughout the year, one episode each month. It is supported by an interactive website with games, puzzles, photographs, behind the scene photographs and information, messages and videos from the characters.

The series aired exclusively to FMC on the first Saturday of every month in 2012, and the following day the episode was available to download on iTunes or rent from BigPond Movies. Previous episodes are already available for download or rent online. Viewers can sign up to iTunes for a complete season pass download to own all 12 episodes.

The series was shot in blocks of 4 episodes with a different director for each set: Paul Goldman for the first block, Pino Amenta for the second block, and Steve Mann for the third block. The Director of Photography is Laszlo Baranyai ACS HSC and the Production Design is by Tel Stolfo. The Story Producers are Michael Brindley and Mark Shirreffs. The series is written by Sam Carroll, Kristen Dunphy, Shanti Gudgeon, Julie Lacy, Michael Miller, Michelle Offen, and Kris Wyld, accompanied by the novels written by Gabrielle Lord.

Cast
 Harrison Gilbertson as Callum "Cal" Ormond
 Taylor Glockner as Boges
 Marny Kennedy as Winter Frey
 David Whiteley as Rafe Ormond and Tom Ormond
 Julia Zemiro as Oriana de la Force
 Rob Carlton as Vulkan Sligo
 Kate Kendall as Emily Ormond 
 Ryan O'Kane as Detective Dorian McGrath
 Debbie Zukerman as Detective Ferrara  
 Aaron Jakubenko as Yuri and Zombie
 Sachin Joab as Bruno
 Dion Mills as Eric Blair  
 Andrew Curry as Kelvin
 James Sorensen as Jake
 Damien Richardson as Nelson Sharkey

List of episodes

(Episode information retrieved from Australian Television Information Archive).

There is one episode for each month of the year. At the end of each month Callum is placed in a dangerous situation which provides suspense until the next episode.

See also
 List of Australian television series

References

External links
 Official TV Series website
 Movie Network Channels
 Circa Media website

2012 Australian television series endings
2012 Australian television series debuts
English-language television shows